Dennis Coi (11 August 1961 – 1 September 1987) was a Canadian figure skater. He was the 1978 World Junior Champion and the 1982 Canadian bronze medallist. Coi also competed in pair skating; with partner Julie Mutchen, he was the 1974 Canadian novice bronze medallist.

Coi was gay, although he did not come out even to his own family until being diagnosed with HIV. He died of AIDS in 1987, amid a spate of AIDS-related deaths of Canadian figure skaters, including Brian Pockar, Robert McCall and Shaun McGill, which was portrayed in the media as a major crisis for the sport.

Competitive highlights

Men's singles

Pairs with Mutchen

References

External links
 
 
  

Canadian male single skaters
Canadian male pair skaters
AIDS-related deaths in Canada
1961 births
1987 deaths
World Junior Figure Skating Championships medalists
LGBT figure skaters
Canadian LGBT sportspeople
Gay sportsmen
20th-century Canadian people
20th-century Canadian LGBT people
Canadian gay men